This is a list of years in the environment. The subjects relate to environmental law, conservation, environmentalism and environmental issues.

Some of the more notable events are listed here with a full list on the respective pages.

List of years

1920s
1927

1940s
1948

1950s
1954

1960s
1962 - Silent Spring, the widely acclaimed book by Rachel Carson which documented the effects of indiscriminate use of pesticides, is published.
1963
1964
1965
1968
1969

1970s
1970
1971
1972 - The Limits to Growth was published. The book is about the computer modelling of unchecked economic and population growth with finite resource supplies, and became both controversial and influential.
1973
1974
1975 
1976 - Ongoing oil spills began in Nigeria leading to various environmental issues in the Niger Delta.
1977
1978 - The Amoco Cadiz oil spill occurred on the coast of Brittany resulting in the largest oil spill of its kind in history to that date.
1979 - The Three Mile Island accident, a partial nuclear meltdown that released radioactive material, occurred in the United States.

1980s
1980
1981
1982
1983
1984
1985 - the International Tropical Timber Agreement enters into force.
1986 - the Chernobyl disaster, a catastrophic nuclear accident, occurred at the Chernobyl Nuclear Power Plant in Ukraine
1987
1988 - the Vienna Convention for the Protection of the Ozone Layer enters into force.
1989 - the Exxon Valdez oil spill occurred in Prince William Sound, Alaska.

1990s
1990
1991
1992
1993 - the Convention on Biological Diversity, known informally as the Biodiversity Convention, enters into force.  It is an international legally binding treaty.
1994 - the United Nations Framework Convention on Climate Change (UNFCCC) enters into force.
1995
1996
1997
1998
1999

2000s
2000
2001
2002 - the World Summit on Sustainable Development, WSSD or Earth Summit 2002 took place in Johannesburg, South Africa, from 26 August to 4 September 2002. It was convened to discuss sustainable development by the United Nations.
2003
2004
2005
2006
2007
2008
2009

2010s
2010
 - 2010 is declared to be the International Year of Biodiversity by the United Nations General Assembly.
 - The Deepwater Horizon oil spill in the Gulf of Mexico flows unabated for three months.
2011 - 2011 was declared the International Year of Forests by the United Nations
2012
2013
2014
2015
2016
2019

2020s
2020 – starting with 2020 these articles also include significant events in environmental sciences
2021
2022
2023

See also
Timeline of environmental history
Timeline of the history of environmentalism

 
 
Environment